Suzad Iqbal Khan is an Indian writer and film director. He directed movies such as Monsoon, Madhubani, My Father Iqbal, Murari: The Mad Gentleman, Surgical-Strike, Khori..In Search Of and the music video "Rab Di Mehar".

Early life

Suzad Iqbal Khan was born on 6 August 1989 in a hill station Banni district kathua to his parents Mohd Iqbal and Suraya Bano. He studied in army school Damana  but for his interest in film making he moved to Mumbai on his 19th birthday in 2008 and started searching work in Bollywood as he assisted Ram Gopal Verma and Ramesh deo many other Directors and further in 2015 he did his Hindi debut film Monsoon and then more films like Murari the Mad Gentleman, My Father Iqbal which were released before 2016.

Filmography

 Monsoon (2015)
  Murari the gentleman (2016)
 My Father Iqbal (2016)
 Rab Di Mehar (music Video) (2018)
  Surgical-strike (Film) (2019)
 Khori (In Search Of ?) (2019) (post-production)
 Majnoo (Punjabi) (2019) (post-production)
 Deep in the woods Death Warrant (web series) (2022)
 Ek Battey Do (Film) (2020)

References

https://www.imdb.com/title/tt16747538/

External links

Film directors from Mumbai
Living people
Year of birth missing (living people)